Matti Sundelin (born 4 December 1934 in Turku) is a Finnish former footballer.

He earned 5 caps at international level between 1937 and 1941, scoring 2 goals.

At club level Sundelin played for TPS. He scored 30 goals in the 1960 Mestaruussarja season, which is still the record for top-tier football in Finland. In the same season he scored 7 goals against IF Drott, which is still the record number of goals scored in a single top-tier football match in Finland.

Honours

Finnish Championship: 1928, 1939, 1941, 1945
Mestaruussarja Top Scorer: 1957, 1959, 1960

References

1934 births
Finnish footballers
Finland international footballers
Turun Palloseura footballers
Footballers from Turku
Living people
Finland B international footballers

Association footballers not categorized by position
Mestaruussarja players